Lalchungnunga (born 25 December 2000) is an Indian professional footballer who plays as a defender for Indian Super League club East Bengal.

Career

Aizawl

Lalchungnunga joined Aizawl on 1 July 2019 from their U18 club. He made his first appearance on 30 January 2021, against NEROCA. He played four matches for the club in 2020–21.

Sreenidi Deccan
In August 2021, Sreenidi Deccan roped in Lalchungnunga, on a two-year deal with an option to extend by another year. On 27 December 2021, he made his debut for the club against NEROCA, in a 3–2 loss.

East Bengal
In August 2022, Indian Super League club East Bengal announced the signing of Lalchungnunga, on loan from I-League club Sreenidi Deccan. On 22 August, he made his debut against Indian Navy in the Durand Cup, which ended in a 0–0 stalemate. Lalchungnunga made his league debut for East Bengal on 7 October against Kerala Blasters in a 1–3 defeat. On 25 December 2022, East Bengal announced that Lalchungnunga has signed permanently for the club, effective from 1 June 2023, untill 2026.

Career statistics

Club

References

2000 births
Living people
Footballers from Mizoram
Indian footballers
Association football defenders
Aizawl FC players
I-League players
Sreenidi Deccan FC players